Robert Murray Hill  (born 25 September 1946) is a retired Australian politician. He is an Adjunct Professor in Sustainability and Co-Director of the Alliance 21 project at the United States Studies Centre at the University of Sydney. He is also a Commissioner of the Global Ocean Commission.

Early life and family

Born in Adelaide, Hill studied at Scotch College, Adelaide and the University of Adelaide, where he took degrees in Arts and Law, and later the London School of Economics, where he gained a master's degree in law. Hill was a barrister and solicitor before entering politics.

He was Vice-President of the Liberal Party in South Australia 1977–79 and President 1985–87. Like many South Australian Liberals, Hill belonged to the liberal or moderate wing of the Liberal Party. He was also a member of the Liberal Party's Federal Executive 1985–87 and 1990–93.

Hill comes from a political family. His father, Murray Hill, was a prominent Liberal member of the South Australian Legislative Council from 1965 to 1988. His daughter, Victoria, is an Australian actress.

Career

Political career
Hill was elected as a Senator for the State of South Australia, representing the Liberal Party, at the 1980 Federal election. He took his seat in the Senate on 1 July 1981, and served until 15 March 2006.

Following the announcement of the 1987 Senate election results, Hill was one of four senators who received a three-year term as a consequence of which method was chosen to allocate the seats.

After the Liberals' defeat (their fourth consecutive loss) at the 1990 federal election, Hill became Leader of the Opposition in the Senate (1990–96), and held appointments during these years as Shadow Minister for Foreign Affairs, Defence, Public Administration and Education, Science and Training. In 1994 he was Chairman of the Senate's Policy Review Committee.

In 1994 he was unsuccessful in seeking Liberal preselection for the House of Representatives seat of Boothby for the 1996 election. The preselected candidate was instead Andrew Southcott who went on to win the seat at the 1996 election and Hill remained in the Senate until his retirement in 2006.

Following the landslide election victory of the Liberals under John Howard in 1996, Hill became Leader of the Government in the Senate (1996–2006) and Minister for the Environment (1996–98). He was subsequently appointed Minister for the Environment and Heritage (1998–2001) and Minister for Defence (2001–06).

On 1 January 2001, Hill was awarded the Centenary Medal for "service as Minister for Defence".

In July 2005 the Coalition parties took control of the Senate and Hill became the first Government Leader in the Senate since 1981 to command a majority in the chamber.

In January 2006, Hill announced his resignation from the Ministry and as Leader of the Government in the Senate. He did not specify a reason for his resignation, but said it was his decision to retire and he had not been pushed into it by the Prime Minister. However, one of The Age's senior journalists, Michelle Grattan, said on 31 March 2008 "Hill had not really wanted to leave Parliament, but John Howard was anxious to get him out."

On 15 March 2006, Hill resigned from the Senate and, two days later, was appointed Permanent Representative to the United Nations for Australia, replacing Caroline Millar. He served in that position until May 2009.

The diplomatic appointment made upon his retirement from Parliament was arranged by Foreign Minister and former Liberal leader Alexander Downer. Hill and Downer were factional rivals in their home state of South Australia and Downer was keen to see Hill out of Parliament as part of Downer's long-term plan to return to the Liberal Party leadership which never eventuated.

It has been alleged that when Downer was Opposition Leader in 1994 he had failed to back Hill's bid to move to the Lower House for the seat of Boothby.

Hill's diplomatic appointment had been criticized by then Shadow Foreign Minister and future Prime Minister Kevin Rudd who had doubts about Hill's diplomatic skills and said that the Howard Government had used the diplomatic service as "a Liberal Party employment agency" and this had left diplomats without the capacity to realise their ambitions.

Prior to Hill's retirement in 2006 he voted for legalizing the abortion drug RU486 which had been banned in Australia up until that point

As Liberal Government Senate leader Hill had expressed the importance of the transition of the Prime Ministership from Howard to his Liberal deputy and heir apparent Peter Costello be smooth. It was a transition that never eventuated when Howard lost government at the 2007 election and Costello refused to succeed Howard as Liberal leader.

Later career
Following his return to Australia in 2009, Hill accepted an appointment as Adjunct Professor in Sustainability at the US Studies Centre at the University of Sydney where he was involved in the development of the $2 million Dow Sustainability Program, funded by the US-based Dow Chemical Company Foundation, to bring together academic and policy experts from Australia and the US to develop action-oriented solutions to a range of sustainability challenges concerning energy, water, food and biodiversity that are technologically innovative, commercially scalable and politically viable.

In July 2009, Hill was appointed by the Australian Government to head the Australian Carbon Trust.

The University of Adelaide announced on 9 April 2010 that Hill had been appointed Chancellor of the University. He completed the second of two two-year terms on 25 July 2014.

On 11 June 2012, Hill was named a Companion of the Order of Australia (AC) for "eminent service to the Parliament of Australia, particularly through the development of policy reform in the portfolios of the environment and defence, and to Australia's international relations through senior diplomatic representation to the United Nations."

Hill is an advisory board member of United Against Nuclear Iran and the Counter Extremism Project.

In 2018 it was reported that Hill was a member of the high-level group established to explore reforming the Commonwealth, with an emphasis on the rules of succession for the title of Head of the Commonwealth.

References

External links

1946 births
Alumni of the London School of Economics
Chancellors of the University of Adelaide
Companions of the Order of Australia
Delegates to the Australian Constitutional Convention 1998
20th-century Australian politicians
Liberal Party of Australia members of the Parliament of Australia
Living people
Members of the Cabinet of Australia
Members of the Australian Senate
Members of the Australian Senate for South Australia
Permanent Representatives of Australia to the United Nations
Recipients of the Centenary Medal
Academic staff of the University of Adelaide
Adelaide Law School alumni
Academic staff of the University of Sydney
Defence ministers of Australia
21st-century Australian politicians
Government ministers of Australia